The 2002 Northeast Conference men's basketball tournament was held in March. The tournament featured the league's top eight seeds. Central Connecticut won the championship, its second, and received the conference's automatic bid to the 2002 NCAA Tournament.

Format
The NEC Men’s Basketball Tournament consisted of an eight-team playoff format with the quarterfinal and semifinal games played at the Spiro Sports Center in Staten Island, NY. The Championship game was played at the court of the highest remaining seed, Central Connecticut.

Bracket

All-tournament team
Tournament MVP in bold.

References

Northeast Conference men's basketball tournament
Tournament
Northeast Conference men's basketball tournament
Northeast Conference men's basketball tournament